Good Gracious is the first album by Australian hip hop producer M-Phazes. Released in February 2010 on Obese Records, each track features different artists, including Drapht, Bliss n Eso, Illy and Forthwrite (360 and Pez).

At the J Awards of 2010, the album was nominated for Australian Album of the Year.

Reception
Reviewer and Triple J announcer Dom Alessio described the album as "a veritable roll call of Aussie hip-hop’s patricians, it’s indicative of the amount of kudos in the bank for M-Phazes", adding "Good Gracious really serves as a great introduction into the stronger facets of Australian hip-hop." Dan Rule of The Vine described it as "an incredibly well balanced record and one that exemplifies M-Phazes’ deft ability to craft not just a kicking beat, but a full-length album of them." A review on Sputnik Music praised the production and beats.

Track listing

Charts

References 

ARIA Award-winning albums
M-Phazes albums
Obese Records albums
2010 debut albums